Bark scorpion may refer to:

 Various Centruroides species, including:
 Baja California bark scorpion (Centruroides exilicauda)
 Arizona bark scorpion (Centruroides sculpturatus)
 Striped bark scorpion (Centruroides vittatus)
 Australian bark scorpion (Lychas marmoreus)

Animal common name disambiguation pages